Alexandra Daisy Ginsberg (born 1982) is a British and South African artist who lives and works in London, UK. She is known for artworks that explore the relationship between humans, technology and nature.

Early life and education

Ginsberg completed an MA (Cantab) in Architecture from the University of Cambridge in 2004. She attended Harvard University as a Visiting Student between 2005 - 2006. In 2009, Ginsberg received an MA in Design Interactions at the Royal College of Art, London, UK. In 2017, Ginsberg completed a PhD at the Royal College of Art. Her thesis explored the notion of ‘better’ in relation to design and synthetic biology.

Career

Ginsberg’s artworks focus on humans' relationship with the non-human world, broaching themes such as artificial intelligence, synthetic biology, biodiversity, nature, conservation, and evolution. Her background in design and synthetic biology often informs her artistic practice.

Her installations have been shown at the Centre Pompidou, Museum of Modern Art, Somerset House, Museum of Contemporary Art Tokyo and Royal Academy. In 2021, she was commissioned by the Eden Project to create a pollinator-friendly artwork, taking the shape of gardens generated by an algorithm.

Ginsberg has discussed her projects at various l institutions, including the Natural History Museum, London; Serpentine Gallery, London; Royal Academy, London; Museo Nacional Thyssen-Bornemisza, Madrid; Centre Pompidou, Paris; V&A Museum, London; MIT, Boston; Museum of Modern Art, New York  and Ted Global.

She has been the recipient of awards such as Breakthrough of the Year, Science in the Arts, Falling Walls, 2020; The Rapoport Award for Women in Art & Tech, 2019; Changemaker Award, Dezeen, 2019; London Design Medal, 2012 and Future 50, Icon Magazine, 2013.

Collections

 Art Institute of Chicago
 Cooper Hewitt
 ZKM Center for Art and Media Karlsruhe
 This link presents Dr. Ginsberg’s design for Eden Project and summer 2022 exhibit at Kensington Gardens Serpentine Galleries.

References

1982 births
Living people
British artists
Synthetic biology artists
British contemporary artists
21st-century British women artists
21st-century English women
British conceptual artists
Alumni of the Royal College of Art